Otto Ernest Passman (June 27, 1900 – August 13, 1988) was an American politician who served in the United States House of Representatives for Louisiana's 5th congressional district from 1947 until 1977. As a congressman, Passman chaired the House Appropriations Subcommittee on Foreign Aid where he was a well-known opponent of foreign aid spending.

Passman was born on June 27, 1900, in Franklinton, Louisiana, the son of Ed and Pheriby (née Carrier) Passman. Passman graduated from Soule Business College in 1929, and engaged in the manufacture and sale of appliances. He married Willie Lenora Bateman in the early 1920s, and she died in 1984. He married his secretary, Martha Kathryn Williams (1926–2005), later that year in Arlington, Virginia.

Passman served in the United States Navy during World War II from 1942 until 1944, and after the war ended, Passman ran for Congress against incumbent Congressman Charles E. McKenzie. Passman defeated McKenzie in the 1946 Democratic primary. During Passman's time in Congress, winning the Democratic primary in Louisiana was considered tantamount to election. Passman was accused of influence peddling in the time leading up to the 1976 Primary. Jerry Huckaby challenged Passman in that election and defeated him by a 53% to 47% margin.

During his tenure, Passman was one of only three Representatives who voted to reject the Judiciary Committee's report on the Watergate scandal following Nixon's resignation; Passman joined Earl Landgrebe and Sonny Montgomery as the three opposed compared to 412 in favor.

In his last years in office, Passman was sued for firing his deputy administrative assistant, Shirley Davis. When terminating Davis, Passman wrote that "it was essential that the understudy to my Administrative Assistant be a man." Davis alleged a violation of the Due Process Clause of the Fifth Amendment due to discrimination on the basis of sex. This raised a question of whether the earlier Bivens case, which authorized direct enforcement of the Fourth Amendment against federal officers, could also be expanded to other constitutional amendments. The Supreme Court determined in Davis v. Passman that Davis had a claim under Bivens and remanded the case for further hearing.

After leaving Congress, Passman was charged with taking $273,000 from Tongsun Park while in Congress and was found not guilty after a trial in Monroe.

References

1900 births
1988 deaths
Members of the United States House of Representatives from Louisiana
Louisiana Democrats
United States Navy personnel of World War II
20th-century American politicians
Old Right (United States)